Alasika S. Taufa, known also as Alaska Taufa (Born 14 August 1970) is a Tongan former rugby union who played as wing. He is father of his namesake Alaska Taufa, who is also a Tongan rugby union international.

Career
Taufa first played for Tonga on 4 July 1993, against Australia, in Brisbane. He was also part of the 1995 Rugby World Cup Tonga squad, playing two matches in the tournament, with the match against Scotland in Pretoria, on 30 May 1995 being his final international cap.
At club level, Taufa played the National Provincial Championship for Wellington between 1992 and 1995.

References

External links

Alaska S. Taufa at New Zealand Rugby History

1970 births
Living people
Tongan expatriates in New Zealand
Tongan rugby union players
Tonga international rugby union players
Wellington rugby union players
Expatriate rugby union players in New Zealand
Rugby union wings